William Chetcuti (born 7 January 1985) is a Maltese sport shooter who specializes in the double trap.  He won the 2011 World Cup event in Beijing and the 2004 European Junior Championship where he set what is still a world record.  He was the first Maltese shooter to win a World Cup medal.

At the 2004 Olympic Games he finished in joint sixth place in the double trap qualification. Following a shoot-off he finished ninth, missing out on a place among the top six, who progressed to the final round. He was the flag bearer at the opening ceremony.

He won a bronze medal at both the 2002 and 2006 Commonwealth Games.

He then finished sixth at the 2008 World Championships. At the 2008 Olympic Games he again finished in joint sixth place in the double trap qualification. Following a shoot-off he finished eighth.

William claimed gold at the Double Trap Men Final in 2011, finishing on the highest step of the podium with a total score of 185 targets.  He also won Malta's first Olympic quota place in any sport and has participated in the London 2012 Olympic Games, finishing in ninth.  He was also the Maltese flagbearer at these Games.

Maltese double trap shooter William Chetcuti won a gold medal in the 2013 Mediterranean Games.  This was the first gold medal in any event for Malta since Malta started participating in these games.

Parliamentary Secretary for Research, Innovation, Youths and Sport, Stefan Buontempo congratulated Mr Chetcuti, the Malta Shooting Federation and the Maltese Olympic Committee for the part they played in the history making event that took place yesterday, when the first gold medal was won for Malta in the Mediterranean Games.

Mr Buontempo also congratulated athletes Adam Vella, David Farrugia and Stefan Farrugia for the excellent results obtained. These results encourage more investment by the Government in the sporting industry.

Chetcuti took up shooting at the age of 10, being introduced to the sport by his father and grandfather.

References

External links
 

1985 births
Living people
People from Pietà, Malta
Maltese male sport shooters
Shooters at the 2004 Summer Olympics
Shooters at the 2008 Summer Olympics
Shooters at the 2012 Summer Olympics
Shooters at the 2016 Summer Olympics
Olympic shooters of Malta
World record holders in shooting
Trap and double trap shooters
Shooters at the 2002 Commonwealth Games
Shooters at the 2006 Commonwealth Games
Shooters at the 2014 Commonwealth Games
Shooters at the 2018 Commonwealth Games
Commonwealth Games bronze medallists for Malta
Commonwealth Games medallists in shooting
Competitors at the 2005 Mediterranean Games
Competitors at the 2013 Mediterranean Games
Competitors at the 2018 Mediterranean Games
Mediterranean Games gold medalists for Malta
Mediterranean Games bronze medalists for Malta
Mediterranean Games medalists in shooting
Medallists at the 2002 Commonwealth Games
Medallists at the 2006 Commonwealth Games